Gordonella is a genus of prawns within the family Solenoceridae. There are currently 3 species assigned to the genus.

Species 

 Gordonella kensleyi 
 Gordonella paravillosa 
 Gordonella villosa

References 

Decapod genera
Solenoceridae